Alma Bella (13 March 1910,  Batangas City, Batangas, Philippines – 11 May 2012, New York City) was a Filipina actress.

Filmography
 1932 - Sa Pinto ng Langit
 1932 – Satanas
 1932 - Ulong Inasnan
 1933 - Pag-ibig ng Isang Kadete
 1933 - Ang Punyal na Ginto
 1933 - Ang Mga Ulila
 1936 - Ama
 1937 - Umaraw sa Hatinggabi
 1937 - Magkapatid
 1938 - Ang Batang Tulisan  [Filippine]
 1938 - Dugong Hinugasan  [Filippine]
 1938 - Biyaya ni Bathala  [Filippine]
 1939 - Pighati  [Del Monte]
 1939 - Mga Pusong Lumuluha  [Sinukuan]
 1940 - Inang Pulot  [Del Monte]
 1948 - 4 na Dalangin  [Luis Nolasco]
 1948 - Siete Dolores [Nolasco Bros.]
 1949 - Ang Lumang Simbahan  [Nolasco Bros.]
 1950 - Pedro,  Pablo,  Juan at Jose  [Luis F. Nolasco]
 1950 - Aklat ng Pag-ibig  [Balintawak]
 1951 - Irog,  Paalam  [Benito Bros.]

References

External links
 

1910 births
2012 deaths
Filipino centenarians
Filipino silent film actresses
20th-century Filipino actresses
Women centenarians
Filipino expatriates in the United States